The Melbourne University Law Review is a triannual law journal published by a student group at Melbourne Law School covering all areas of law. It is one of two student-run law journals at the University of Melbourne, the other being the Melbourne Journal of International Law. Students who have completed at least one semester of law are eligible to apply for membership of the editorial board. Applicants are assessed on the basis of their performance in a practical exercise, academic aptitude, proofreading skills, editing skills and enthusiasm. The 2022 editors-in-chief are Daniel Beratis, Danielle Feng and Deylan Kilic-Aidani.

Occasionally, the journal produces a symposium issue devoted to a particular aspect of law. Past symposium issues have focused on the centenary of the federation of Australia, contemporary human rights in Australia, and tort law. The Review's alumni include two High Court Justices, three Solicitors-General, five Federal Court judges and at least six Supreme Court judges.

Rankings

The journal has been awarded an A* ranking by the Australian Business Law Deans Council.

History

The Summons 
The first periodical published at the Melbourne Law School was The Summons. It appeared with the subtitle A Magazine of Legal and General Literature and was published by the Articled Law Clerks' Society of Victoria between 1891 and 1903. It was a yellow-covered sixteen-page journal depicting an angel with a trumpet on its cover and served as more of a current affairs magazine than an academic journal, publishing reports of moots and discussing topical issues, which at the time included the fusion of the two branches of the Victorian legal profession and the admission of women.

Res Judicatae 
In 1935, the students of the Faculty of Law established Res Judicatae — roughly translated as "things that have been judicially adjudicated on" — which was intended to provide a forum for discussion and debate among students of the law. Published by the Law Students' Society of Victoria, it focused on legal journalism.

Notable publications include C S Lewis on 'The Humanitarian Theory of Punishment', Owen Dixon on 'De Facto Officers', H V Evatt on 'Amending the Constitution', John Latham on 'The Law Student', and the re-printing of Frank Gavan Duffy's poem, 'A Dream of Fair Judges' (originally published in The Summons).

Melbourne University Law Review 
In 1957, Zelman Cowen (then dean of the faculty and later governor-general of Australia) re-established the journal along the model of the Harvard Law Review and renamed it the Melbourne University Law Review. In line with prevailing American practice, top ranking law students were invited to become members of the editorial board. In 1998, the number of issues published each year was increased from two to three.

Alumni 
Notable alumni of the Melbourne University Law Review include:

Australian Guide to Legal Citation 
In collaboration with the Melbourne Journal of International Law, the journal publishes the Australian Guide to Legal Citation.

References

External links 
 

Australian law journals
University of Melbourne
Triannual journals
Publications established in 1957
English-language journals
Open access journals